Gary Jackson (born September 11, 1950) is an American politician from Mississippi. A Republican, Jackson was first elected to the Mississippi Senate in November 2003. He was re-elected in 2007 and 2011. He resigned on June 30, 2020 due to health issues. He is a graduate of East Mississippi Community College and Mississippi State University.

References

1950 births
Living people
Republican Party Mississippi state senators
Mississippi State University alumni
People from Starkville, Mississippi
People from Choctaw County, Mississippi
East Mississippi Community College alumni
21st-century American politicians